John Stuart Yeates  (11 July 1900 – 24 August 1986) was a New Zealand academic and botanist. The founding head of Agricultural Botany at Massey Agricultural College, he was also an accomplished breeder of azaleas, rhododendrons and lilies.

Early life and education
Born into a farming family in Waitara in the Taranaki, Yeates attended Stratford District High School, where he won an Entrance Scholarship (later called the University Entrance Scholarship), and then Victoria College (now Victoria University of Wellington, then part of the University of New Zealand) in Wellington. He completed a BSc and then a MSc in Botany with first class honours. He obtained a Jacob Joseph Scholarship.

He then completed the first PhD from the University of New Zealand

He was also an active member of the Victoria College Tramping Club, having Yeates Peak and Yeates track in the Tararua Range named after him.

He left for Trinity College, Cambridge, where he studied chromosomal counts in plants, starting in 1925. He returned to New Zealand in July 1927 and was awarded his Trinity College PhD in 1931, having completed his research in parallel with his teaching commitments at the newly created Massey College (now Massey University, then also part of the University of New Zealand) outside Palmerston North.

Academic work
His early research was on New Zealand flax/Phormium tenax (Māori: harakeke), which at the time was used extensively as fibre for ropes and cloths. One of the key centres for production was the delta of the Manawatu River, but Yeates travelled extensively looking for quality cultivars which he grew on the Turitea campus. Flax had long been used for textiles (see Māori traditional textiles) and it was correctly guessed that the best cultivars were to be found adjacent to historical sites of textile-making. The Great Depression of the 1930s caused serious damaged the commercial flax industry in New Zealand and it never recovered.

Some of the flax worked involved chromosome counting, which he had previously done in his thesis work. The flax Ngaro was found to have 32 rather than the normal 24 chromosomes.

Later research involved "farm forestry", a movement to introduce trees onto farms for the benefit of livestock, pasture and crops and as a source of income.

He was the founding head of Agricultural Botany at Massey and this was his core teaching area. In 1954 he, with E. O. Campbell, published Agricultural Botany, a textbook based on this teaching.

Plant breeding 

Yeates was a foundation member of the New Zealand Rhododendron Association in 1944 and also its some-time Secretary-Treasurer. He was also crucial in the founding of the national garden of the association (now "Heritage Park") at Kimbolton (which is close to his home in Palmerston North, but has better soil and climate for rhododendron). He was also active in the introduction and breeding of azaleas, rhododendrons and Lilium hybrids.

Lilies
Lilium auratum and Lilium speciosum were first crossed in the 1860s, but then not again until the 1950s by Yeates and Leslie Jury in New Zealand.

The name Melford Hybrids was used for his lily crosses, which he bred initially at his property on Long Melford Rd, in Palmerston North. His cultivars include:

Awards 
 1918 Entrance Scholarship
 1922 National Research Scholarship
 1925 First Post-Graduate Scholarship in Science
 1957 Associate of Honour of the Royal New Zealand Institute of Horticulture.
 1968 Veitch Memorial Medal, Royal Horticultural Society
 1969 Lyttel Lily Cup, Royal Horticultural Society
 1977 Member of the Order of the British Empire (MBE), for services to horticulture, in the 1978 New Year Honours

Bibliography 
 J. S. Yeates, "The Root Nodules of Conifers" – 1923 – MSc thesis Victoria University College
 J. S. Yeates, "The Nucleolus of Tmesipteris tannensis" Proceedings of the Royal Society London. Ser. B. 98, 1925, 227–224.
 J. S. Yeates, Some problems in the comparison of Chromosomes – 1931  – PhD thesis University of Cambridge
 J. S. Yeates, Farm Trees and Hedges – 1942 – Massey Agricultural College (University of New Zealand)
 J. S. Yeates, Farm Trees and Hedges 2nd Edition – 1948 – Massey Agricultural College (University of New Zealand)
 J. S. Yeates and E. O. Campbell, Agricultural Botany 1954 – Massey Agricultural College (University of New Zealand)
 J. S. Yeates and E. O. Campbell, Agricultural Botany 2nd Edition 1960 – Government Printer (Wellington, New Zealand)
 J. S. Yeates  Rhododendron Growing in New Zealand; Its Past, Present, and Future 1972 – Journal American Rhododendron Society
 J. S. Yeates Regular articles in The New Zealand Gardener 1940s–1950s

References

Further reading
 Who's who in New Zealand 3rd Edition (1932)
 Who's who in New Zealand 6th Edition (1956)

 Notable New Zealander's The Pictorial Who's Who 1st Edition (1976)
 John Stuart Yeates by J.E.Godley, Biographical Notes (67) serialised in New Zealand Botanical Society Newsletter 90–92, 2007–2008.

External links 
 Heritage Park Heritage Park rhododendron garden, formerly National Garden of the New Zealand Rhododendron Association
 John Stuart Yeates, Massey College. (ca December 1951). Image of Yeates at work, in the collection of the Alexander Turnbull Library
 Mentioned in the letters of John Cawte Beaglehole held by the New Zealand Electronic Text Centre

1900 births
1986 deaths
Victoria University of Wellington alumni
Alumni of Trinity College, Cambridge
Academic staff of the Massey University
New Zealand Members of the Order of the British Empire
20th-century New Zealand botanists
People from Waitara, New Zealand
Veitch Memorial Medal recipients